RV Maurice Ewing was a research vessel operated by the Lamont–Doherty Earth Observatory of Columbia University.  It was retired in 2005 and replaced by RV Marcus Langseth in 2008.  Although a multipurpose vessel, Maurice Ewings notable capability was to collect multichannel seismic data.

Maurice Ewing was named for William Maurice "Doc" Ewing, geophysicist and first director of Lamont Geological Observatory (now known as Lamont–Doherty Earth Observatory).

The vessel was later renamed several times: - Scan Resolution, Bergan Resolution, the Reflect Resolution, and the NORDIC BAHARI. Still to this day the vessel operates as a multi-streamer seismic research vessel.

External links 
 
 
 

1983 ships
Research vessels of the United States
University-National Oceanographic Laboratory System research vessels
Columbia University